Worawut Wangsawad is a Thai professional football coach and former player.

Honours

Club
Osotspa M-150 F.C.
 Kor Royal Cup Winner (2) : 2002–2003, 2007

Thai Port F.C.
 Thai League Cup Winner (1) : 2010

External links
 http://www.thaiportfc.com/first-team/players.html

1981 births
Living people
Worawut Wangsawad
Worawut Wangsawad
Worawut Wangsawad
Worawut Wangsawad
Worawut Wangsawad
Worawut Wangsawad
Worawut Wangsawad
Footballers at the 2002 Asian Games
Worawut Wangsawad
Worawut Wangsawad
Worawut Wangsawad
Association football midfielders
Worawut Wangsawad